Hyacinthe Wodobodé (born 1953) is a Central African politician.

Life
Hyacinthe Wodobodé was born on 16 March 1953 in Bangui. She studied business management, hospital sciences and financial planning in Belgium before returning to work as a civil servant in the Central African Republic in 1983. In 2007 she was appointed coordinator of the National AIDS Committee (Comité national de lutte contre le sida, CNLS). In 2014 Catherine Samba-Panza appointed her as her successor as Mayor of Bangui. In 2016 she was replaced as mayor by Emile Gros Raymond Nakombo.

References

1953 births
Year of birth uncertain
Living people
Government ministers of the Central African Republic
Women government ministers of the Central African Republic
Mayors of Bangui
Women mayors of places in the Central African Republic
Commerce and industry ministers
Justice ministers
Female justice ministers